NGC 199 is a lenticular galaxy located in the constellation Pisces. It was discovered on September 24, 1862 by Heinrich Louis d'Arrest.

See also 
 Lenticular galaxy 
 List of NGC objects (1–1000)
 Pisces (constellation)

References

External links 
 
 
 SEDS

0199
0415
+00-02-111
Lenticular galaxies
Pisces (constellation)
2382
Astronomical objects discovered in 1862